The Sarasota Clay Court Classic was a tennis tournament held in Sarasota, Florida, United States. Held in 2002 and 2003, this WTA Tour event was a Tier IV-tournament and was played on outdoor green clay courts.

Past finals

Singles

Doubles

See also
List of tennis tournaments

External links
 2002 draws
 2003 draws
 Tournament Forum

Defunct tennis tournaments in the United States
Clay court tennis tournaments
WTA Tour